Ferenc Hemrik (25 August 1925 – 12 February 2007) was a Hungarian ski jumper. He competed in the individual event at the 1948 Winter Olympics.

References

1925 births
2007 deaths
Hungarian male ski jumpers
Olympic ski jumpers of Hungary
Ski jumpers at the 1948 Winter Olympics
Skiers from Budapest
20th-century Hungarian people